The 1907–08 Irish Cup was the 28th edition of the premier knock-out cup competition in Irish football. 

Bohemians won the tournament for the 1st time, defeating Shelbourne 3–1 in the final replay, after a 1–1 draw in the original final. This was the first Irish Cup final that did not feature a team from Belfast.

Results

First round

|}

Replay

|}

Quarter-finals

|}

Replays

|}

Semi-finals

|}

Replays

|}

Final

Replay

References

External links
 Northern Ireland Cup Finals. Rec.Sport.Soccer Statistics Foundation (RSSSF)

Irish Cup seasons
1907–08 domestic association football cups
1907–08 in Irish association football